In number theory, a congruum (plural congrua) is the difference between successive square numbers in an arithmetic progression of three squares.

The congruum problem is the problem of finding squares in arithmetic progression and their associated congrua.

When this equation is satisfied, both sides of the equation equal the congruum.

Fibonacci solved the congruum problem by finding a parameterized formula for generating all congrua, together with their associated arithmetic progressions. According to this formula, each congruum is four times the area of a Pythagorean triangle. Congrua are also closely connected with congruent numbers: every congruum is a congruent number, and every congruent number is a congruum multiplied by the square of a rational number.

Examples 
As an example, the number 96 is a congruum because it is the difference between adjacent squares in the sequence 4, 100, and 196 (the squares of 2, 10, and 14 respectively).

The first few congrua are:

History 
The congruum problem was originally posed in 1225, as part of a mathematical tournament held by Frederick II, Holy Roman Emperor, and answered correctly at that time by Fibonacci, who recorded his work on this problem in his Book of Squares.

Fibonacci was already aware that it is impossible for a congruum to itself be a square, but did not give a satisfactory proof of this fact. Geometrically, this means that it is not possible for the pair of legs of a Pythagorean triangle to be the leg and hypotenuse of another Pythagorean triangle. A proof was eventually given by Pierre de Fermat, and the result is now known as Fermat's right triangle theorem. Fermat also conjectured, and Leonhard Euler proved, that there is no sequence of four squares in arithmetic progression.

Parameterized solution 
Additionally, multiplying a congruum by a square number produces another congruum, whose progression of squares is multiplied by the same factor. All solutions arise in one of these two ways.

The congruum itself is four times the area of the same Pythagorean triangle. The example of an arithmetic progression with the congruum 96 can be obtained in this way from a right triangle with side and hypotenuse lengths 6, 8, and 10.

Relation to congruent numbers 
A congruent number is defined as the area of a right triangle with rational sides.
Because every congruum can be obtained (using the parameterized solution) as the area of a Pythagorean triangle, it follows that every congruum is congruent. Conversely, every congruent number is a congruum multiplied by the square of a rational number. However, testing whether a number is a congruum is much easier than testing whether a number is congruent. For the congruum problem, the parameterized solution reduces this testing problem to checking a finite set of parameter values. In contrast, for the congruent number problem, a finite testing procedure is known only conjecturally, via Tunnell's theorem, under the assumption that the Birch and Swinnerton-Dyer conjecture is true.

See also 
Automedian triangle, a triangle for which the squares on the three sides form an arithmetic progression
Spiral of Theodorus, formed by right triangles whose (non-integer) sides, when squared, form an infinite arithmetic progression

References

External links 

Diophantine equations
Integer sequences
Squares in number theory
Theorems in number theory